Maurice Blanchard Cohill Jr. (November 26, 1929 – January 1, 2022) was a United States district judge of the United States District Court for the Western District of Pennsylvania.

Education and career
Born in Pittsburgh, Pennsylvania, Cohill received an Artium Baccalaureus degree from Princeton University in 1951 and a Bachelor of Laws from the University of Pittsburgh School of Law in 1956. He was a captain in the United States Marine Corps from 1951 to 1953. He was in private practice in Pittsburgh from 1956 to 1965. He was a judge of the Juvenile Court of Allegheny County, Pennsylvania from 1965 to 1968, and then of the Court of Common Pleas of that county until 1976.

Federal judicial service
On May 4, 1976, Cohill was nominated by President Gerald Ford to a seat on the United States District Court for the Western District of Pennsylvania vacated by Judge Louis Rosenberg. Cohill was confirmed by the United States Senate on May 18, 1976, and received his commission on May 21, 1976. He served as Chief Judge from 1985 to 1992 and assumed senior status on November 28, 1994. He took inactive senior status in 2016, meaning that while he remained a federal judge, he no longer heard cases or participated in the business of the court.

Personal life and death
Cohill died on January 1, 2022, at the age of 92.

References

Sources
 

1929 births
2022 deaths
Judges of the United States District Court for the Western District of Pennsylvania
Pennsylvania state court judges
Princeton University alumni
United States district court judges appointed by Gerald Ford
20th-century American judges
United States Marine Corps officers
University of Pittsburgh School of Law alumni
21st-century American judges
Judges of the Pennsylvania Courts of Common Pleas
Lawyers from Pittsburgh
Military personnel from Pittsburgh